Omorgus expansus is a species of hide beetle in the subfamily Omorginae and subgenus Afromorgus.

References

expansus
Beetles described in 1900